Belgershain is a town in the Leipzig district in Saxony. It is part of the municipal association of Naunhof.

History 
The first documented mention of Belgershain dates from 1296. Threna, since 1996 part of Belgershain, is documented as the seat of Wulferus von Trenowe in 1205 and celebrated its 800th birthday in June 2005

Geography and transportation 
The town is approximately 25 km east of Leipzig.
The town lies on the Federal Road 38 Leipzig - Grimma as well as on the Leipzig–Geithain railway. A train passes through every two hours.

Sights 
 Neo-gothic castle with castle gardens
 Churches in Köhra and Threna from the 13th Century
 Baroque Johanneskirche in Belgershain

Municipal subdivisions
Belgershain has the following subdivisions:
 Belgershain
 Threna
 Köhra
 Rohrbach

Personalities
Film producer Heinz Angermeyer was born in Belgershain in 1900.

References 

Leipzig (district)